Thomas Kent may refer to:
Thomas Kent (1865–1916), Irish rebel executed in 1916
Thomas Kent (Irish judge) (c. 1460–1511), Chief Baron of the Irish Exchequer
Thomas Worrall Kent (1922–2011), Canadian public servant and journalist
Thomas Kent (MP) (1590–1656), English politician
Thomas Kent (priest) (died 1561), Archdeacon of Totnes
Tom Kent, disc jockey
Tom Kent (rugby) (1864–1928), England and British Isles rugby union player
Tom Kent (Casualty), a fictional character from the BBC television drama Casualty, played by Oliver Coleman